Aberfeldy is a locality in Victoria, Australia on Mount Lookout, northeast of the Thomson Dam,  east of Melbourne.

History
The area began to be inhabited in 1871 following the discovery of alluvial gold, although access was made difficult by the rugged terrain and the harsh winters, with sub-zero temperatures and much snow.

The first Aberfeldy Post Office opened on 1 January 1872. It finally closed permanently in 1967. The postmaster from 1880 to 1884 was Henry Donaldson, whose sister, Elizabeth Donaldson had married the Aberfeldy butcher Thomas Dwyer, originally from Tipperary, Ireland.

The eldest of the three Dwyer children was John Patrick, born in Aberfeldy in 1879. His parents both died in 1884, so the children were taken in by their Scottish grandparents David and Annie Donaldson, who ran the general store in nearby Morwell. At that time Henry Donaldson also left Aberfeldy, going to be postmaster in Heyfield, Victoria.

John Partick Dwyer was a child prodigy and after qualifying as a solicitor in Melbourne he was called to the Bar at the age of 23.  He moved to Western Australia in 1904 where he stood out as the possessor of a brilliant legal mind. He was appointed Chief Justice of Western Australia and was knighted in 1946, and then distinguished with a KCMG in 1949. He and his wife are buried together in a simple grave in Karrakatta Cemetery in Perth.

Aberfeldy was surveyed and proclaimed in 1885. It was initially known as Mount Lookout but was eventually renamed after the Scottish town of Aberfeldy. At its peak, the township had a population of around 500. After the end of the gold rush the townsfolk depended for their livelihood upon sheep and cattle grazing and the production of potatoes and other crops.

Following the First World War, the population diminished, although the locality managed to survive. The town hotel was burned down in 1938 and the Black Friday bush-fires of 1939 destroyed many of the buildings in the locality.

On 10 March 1942 a Curtiss P-40 Warhawk of the United States Army Air Force flown by Captain Joseph P McLaughlin crashed near Aberfeldy on a flight from Canberra to Laverton. The plane was discovered in 1948. and in 2005 the pilot's remains were identified and taken to be buried in Arlington National Cemetery.

A road was built to the town of Matlock by 1950, but it was not maintained and became unusable.

Apart from John Patrick Dwyer, the locality's most well-known inhabitant was Kitty Cane, a former dancer and mining investor who owned a successful roadside tavern. Legend has it that when Cane died, her loyal customers and the local miners decided to carry her coffin to the Aberfeldy cemetery. However, since Cane was unusually heavy, weighing 22 stone (140 kilos) and because the miners were intoxicated, the coffin never made it to the cemetery. Instead the miners buried her beside the road. When travelling from The Thomson Dam to Aberfeldy, Kitty Cane's grave is about a kilometre (0.6 miles) after the Cast Iron Point lookout and on the left hand side of the Walhalla-Woods Point Road, Thompson. It is recorded in the Victorian Heritage Inventory: H8122-0102.

Today (2011) there is only one permanent resident, the historian Grahame Code (who has lived in the area for 50 years), and his family.  There is several holiday homes which are occupied occasionally. Land was released for public sale in 1999. Remains of some of the former gold-rush era buildings are still visible.

Climate
Aberfeldy features a cold oceanic climate (Cfb); owing to its elevation and southerly latitude, as well as its somewhat exposed position astride the ranges (although sheltered from the north and west). 

Aberfeldy is frequently coated in snowfall, receiving an average of 32.5 snowy days annually.

References

External links

Australian Places - Aberfeldy

Ghost towns in Victoria (Australia)
Towns in Victoria (Australia)
Shire of Baw Baw